Deverall Island is a small ice-covered island, rising above the Ross Ice Shelf just northeast of Beaumont Bay. It was named by the New Zealand Geological Survey Antarctic Expedition (1960–61) for William H. Deverall, a radio operator at Scott Base, 1961. It is considered to be the southernmost island in the world.

See also 
 List of antarctic and sub-antarctic islands

References 

Islands of the Ross Dependency
Shackleton Coast